Hallgeir H. Langeland (born 14 November 1955 in Strand) is a Norwegian politician for the Socialist Left Party. He was elected to the Parliament of Norway from Rogaland in 1997 and served to 2013 when he lost his seat in the 2013 Norwegian parliamentary election.

He sat on the Stavanger municipal council from 1991 to 1997.

Parliamentary Committee duties 
2005 - 2009 member of the Standing Committee on Transport and Communications.
2001 - 2005 deputy member of the Enlarged Foreign Affairs Committee.
2001 - 2005 deputy leader of the Standing Committee on Energy and the Environment.
1997 - 2001 member of the Standing Committee on Energy and the Environment.
1997 - 2001 deputy member of the Electoral Committee.

External links

1955 births
Living people
People from Strand, Norway
Socialist Left Party (Norway) politicians
Members of the Storting
21st-century Norwegian politicians
20th-century Norwegian politicians